Ngap Sayot is the third studio album by Malaysian rock band from Sarawak, the Masterpiece. It was released in 2014 and their first released through Do Records Entertainment.

Track listing

Credits
Masterpiece
 Depha Masterpiece – vocals, songwriter
 Kennedy Edwin – guitars, vocals, backing vocals
 Willy Edwin – guitars, recording technician
 Roslee Qadir – keyboards, backing vocals
 Valentine Jimmy – keyboards
 Watt Marcus – bass guitar
 Harold Vincent – drums
Production
 Recorded at Masterjam Studio, Sibu, Malaysia
 Mixed and mastered at iMusik Studio, Sibu
 Chant version: Johnny Telson, Albert and Brodie William
 Engineered by Iskandar Bujang
 Artwork: Do Records Entertainment
 Publisher: Do Records Entertainment

Awards

Dayak Music Awards 

|-
| rowspan="2"| 2016 || rowspan="2" | "Ngap Sayot" || Best Vocals || 
|-
| Best Performance ||

References

2014 albums
Masterpiece (band) albums